John McNee may refer to:
 John McNee (diplomat), Canadian diplomat
 Sir John William McNee, British pathologist and bacteriologist
 Jack McNee (John McNee), Scottish footballer